Goldbert Chi Chiu (born 1 August 1981) is a Hong Kong former professional footballer.

Career statistics

International

References

Living people
1981 births
Hong Kong footballers
Association football goalkeepers
Hong Kong First Division League players
Hong Kong Premier League players
Double Flower FA players
Kitchee SC players
Hong Kong Rangers FC players
Eastern Sports Club footballers